There are several lakes named Mud Lake within the U.S. state of Nevada.
 Mud Lake, Churchill County, Nevada. 
 Mud Lake, Douglas County, Nevada. 
 Mud Lake, Elko County, Nevada.	
 Mud Lake, Humboldt County, Nevada.	
 Mud Lake, Nye County, Nevada.	
 Mud Lake, Nye County, Nevada. 
 Mud Lake, Washoe County, Nevada.	
 Winnemucca Lake, also known as Mud Lake, Washoe County, Nevada.	
 Mud Lake, Washoe County, Nevada.	
 Calcutta Lake, also known as Mud Lake, Washoe County, Nevada.

References
 USGS-U.S. Board on Geographic Names

Lakes of Nevada